The 2003 FIFA World Player of the Year award was won by Zinedine Zidane for a record-equalling third time. It was the award's 13th edition. Mia Hamm won the women's award. The gala was hosted at the Messe in Basel, on December 15, 2002. 142 national team coaches, based on the current FIFA Men's World Ranking were chosen to vote for the men's edition and 100 for the women's. The ceremony's theme was the Match Against Poverty that was played the previous day between the Ronaldo and Zidane Xi (3-4) at the St. Jakob-Park in Basel in front of 30,000 spectators. Birgit Prinz won the women's award.

Results

Men

Women

References

FIFA World Player of the Year
FIFA World Player of the Year
Women's association football trophies and awards
2003 in women's association football